Domaine Javier is a Philippine-born actor, nurse, and TV personality. She came to prominence after appearing on the MTV show True Life and being expelled by and suing California Baptist University over her right to study nursing there as a transgender woman.

Early life and education
Javier is of Filipina, Caucasian, Spanish, Pacific Islander, Native American, and Chinese heritage, but mostly identifies as Filipina. She has publicly identified as female since she was 13, and graduated valedictorian from high school despite bullying. She attended Riverside City College, where she was chosen Homecoming queen in 2010. In 2011, she was to have transferred in the fall to California Baptist University, also in Riverside, to study nursing on academic and music scholarships, when an April episode of the MTV reality series True Life based on a year in her life led the university to accuse her of fraud for stating her gender as female on her application; she was suspended and then expelled. She continued her studies at Riverside City College and became a registered nurse. In 2013, she received the prestigious Kaiser Permanente Nursing Scholarship Award via eQuality Scholarship Collaborative for her service to the LGBTQ+ community. In 2013 she sued the university for unlawful discrimination under the California Unruh Civil Rights Act and breach of contract; in July 2014 a judge ruled that as a private religious institution, the college was entitled to exclude transgender people from in-person classes, but that it must not discriminate against them in its for-profit businesses and services open to the public, including on-line classes, and awarded her $4,000 in damages plus costs; the breach of contract suit was rejected on procedural grounds.

In addition to multiple nursing college degrees, Javier has a total of seven college degrees in various fields, including Fine and Applied Arts with emphasis on Performing Arts; Humanities, Philosophy, & Arts; Social and Behavioral Studies; and Math & Science.

Performing career
In November 2011, Javier appeared in an edition of Anderson Cooper's talk show, Anderson Live, on transgender youth.

In June 2020, she was a contestant in the 20th season of Worst Cooks in America, the first openly transgender woman to appear on the Food Network. Under the mentorship of Chef Anne Burrell, Javier finished at 5th place. She returned in 2021 in the companion series Worst Cooks in America: Dirty Dishes where favorite former recruits watch past episodes of the show and react to them. She also competed on the first-ever all-stars season of Worst Cooks in America titled "Best Of The Worst," where fan-favorite recruits from past seasons returned for another shot at redemption. The show premiered on April 25, 2021 and concluded on May 30, 2021. Javier finished as the finalist for Chef Michael Symon's Blue Team and ultimately placed as the runner-up.

As an actress, she appeared in a 2013 episode of Adam Devine's House Party titled "Front Yard Comedy" and was cast as Sü, the lead character in The Switch, a comedy series that became the first television series produced and directed by a transgender person and with all transgender roles played by transgender actors; because it was a Canadian production that requires certain rules and regulations, the role eventually had to be recast.

She has also played small roles in a number of other TV series and feature films, including the 2015 horror short Lucid Dark.

Filmography

Film

Television

References

External links
 
Domaine Javier on Instagram

1990s births
Date of birth missing (living people)
21st-century Filipino actresses
Filipino emigrants to the United States
Filipino television actresses
Filipino LGBT actors
Filipino LGBT rights activists
Living people
Reality cooking competition contestants
Riverside City College alumni
Transgender actresses
Transgender rights activists
21st-century LGBT people